Morgan Mitchell (born 20 July 1993) is a New Zealand professional rugby union player. He plays as a tight head prop for the Toronto Arrows in Major League Rugby and Southland Stags in the Mitre 10 cup. Mitchell was born with a hearing impairment which progressed to being deaf in 2016. He now utilising a cochlear implant & is the first deaf player to play professionally in the Mitre 10.

References

1993 births
Living people
Expatriate rugby union players in Canada
People from Gore, New Zealand
Rugby union props
New Zealand expatriate rugby union players
New Zealand expatriate sportspeople in Canada
Toronto Arrows players
New Zealand rugby union players
Southland rugby union players
Kamaishi Seawaves players
Rugby union players from Southland, New Zealand
Houston SaberCats players